Breviceps passmorei, or Passmore's rain frog or Ndumo rain frog is a species of frog in the genus Breviceps endemic to South Africa.

Description
Breviceps passmorei has extremely abbreviated snout mouth narrow and downturned; short limbs which, at rest, are held close to the body, not projecting beyond the body outline; digits tapering to apex; inner and outer toes very short or rudimentary; inner and outer metatarsal tubercles well developed, confluent or separated by a narrow groove; vent terminal, not deflected downwards.

Distribution 
It is located west of the Tembe Elephant Reserve in the vicinity of the Pongola River near borders of Eswatini and Mozambique, and into southeastern Limpopo Province.

Etymology 
Breviceps passmorei is named after Neville Passmore in recognition of his contributions to South African herpetology in the field of bioacoustics, and for instilling a lifelong interest in frogs among his students, many of whom have also made significant contributions in this and other fields.

References

passmorei
Frogs of Africa
Amphibians of Eswatini
Amphibians of Mozambique
Amphibians of South Africa
Amphibians described in 2017